"Hot Shots" is the third episode of the second season of the HBO original series The Wire. The episode was written by David Simon from a story by David Simon & Ed Burns and was directed by Elodie Keene. It originally aired on June 15, 2003.

Plot
In Philadelphia, Bunk and Freamon interview the crew of the ship that brought the Jane Does into Baltimore, but all pretend to speak no English. The first mate is more forthcoming and explains that the crew members will not speak English in the police's presence, and would not inform on each other, even if interpreters were provided. The detectives agree to let the ship go with little evidence or jurisdiction for interrogation. Back in Baltimore, Landsman questions Bunk and Freamon's decision to let the boat go. Later, Bunk and Beadie try to trace the movements of the shipping container in which the bodies were found and discover that much of the paperwork has been falsified.

McNulty learns that three of the Jane Does had received breast implants in the same clinic in Budapest. Additionally, in the 24 hours before their death, the girls performed various forms of sex. McNulty visits Homicide to give them his theory, but Bunk, Freamon, and Beadie shatter his pride by beating him to everything he was about to say. McNulty and Russell agree that they do not want to see the girls remain unidentified and shipped out as cadavers. Bunk's team take the French addresses listed on the paperwork to the FBI, who give them more information on the international vice trade. Later, while out drinking, McNulty learns that Russell is a single mother. McNulty tells Bunk of his desire to put a name to the dead girl he pulled from the harbor.

Valchek is informed of his missing surveillance van, which is shown to have been delivered to stevedores in Wilmington. Prez is annoyed that the Sobotka detail's commander, Lieutenant Grayson, will not authorize any wiretaps of Frank, and tells Valchek that Daniels would have brought in a better case on the Barksdale detail if Burrell had not interfered. When Valchek threatens to torpedo Burrell's efforts to become Commissioner, the latter is forced to assign Daniels to the detail. Meanwhile, Omar returns to Baltimore with a new boyfriend named Dante. The two eventually join forces with Tosha Mitchell and Kimmy to stick up stash houses together. Omar has to convince Dante he is not interested in the women beyond business.

McNulty encounters Daniels in the evidence room and the two discuss their career misfortunes. Daniels tells McNulty that he has put in for early retirement and plans to become a lawyer. Later, McNulty returns his sons to his ex-wife Elena, who sends him a separation agreement shortly afterward. Meanwhile, Nick's girlfriend Aimee wants them to move in together, which he promises to do when they can afford it. Ziggy again tries to convince Nick to join him in the drug trade. The two steal a container of cameras with the help of Johnny Fifty and sell them to George "Double G" Glekas, a fence for the Greeks. Ziggy angers Glekas by taking his photo with one of the cameras. Glekas checks the deal with Vondas and tells him that although he thinks Ziggy is using drugs and is a "malakas", Nick can be trusted.

Frank attends a political meeting at Father Lewandowski's church with his lobbyist Bruce DiBiago, who advises him to focus on courting the politicians who may not support the stevedores union, including State Senator Clay Davis. Frank takes umbrage when he is told exactly how much money has been routed to Davis but is forced to make nice with the state senator to win his support. Davis makes it clear that he expects more money to come his way in order to vote along with the union's wishes. Frank later meets with a checker named Ringo who is having trouble getting enough work to live on. When Ringo mentions he's contemplating a move to a different local, Frank sends Ringo to Delores's bar and tells him to order a shot and a beer on him. When Ringo arrives at the bar and uses Frank's name, Delores gives him a bundle of cash. Ziggy sees the exchange.

Stringer discusses his stock portfolio with a financial advisor via telephone, while Country and Shamrock listen in; they are together in a vehicle while on a tail of Tilghman. Later, Country and Shamrock watch as Tilghman receives a package of narcotics from Butchie. On Avon's orders, Stringer contacts Butchie and asks him to supply Tilghman with bad product the next time he makes a transaction. Butchie reluctantly agrees when Stringer uses Avon's name and promises compensation. It is revealed that Stringer and D'Angelo's girlfriend, Donette, are having an affair. Avon finds D'Angelo in the prison library and tells him to avoid drugs for a few days. D'Angelo is subsequently unaffected when Tilghman unwittingly smuggles bad heroin into the prison and causes several other inmates to die.

Production

Title reference
The bad package brought into the prison is referred to as "hot shots" by an inmate. According to the glossary in William S. Burroughs's novel Junkie, a hot-shot is a portion of drugs that has been spiked with poison, usually with the intention of killing a police informant or other undesirable. "Hot shots" may also refer to Ziggy and Nick, who are trying to become part of the criminal world independent of Frank Sobotka.

Epigraph

Officer Russell makes this statement in reference to the women involved in the illegal sex trade. This also refers to the eventual alliance of Omar, Dante, Tosha, and Kimmy, as well as the refusal of the Atlantic Light's crew workers to speak to Bunk and Lester. In the show as a whole, it is an ironic quote, as the stevedore union's storyline shows that the power that unions once had has dwindled to almost nothing.

Music
 The song playing when Omar and Dante are in the bedroom is "Get Busy" by Sean Paul.
 The song heard in Tilghman's car is "So Fine" by The Chambers Brothers.
 The song playing when Stringer visits Donette is "Sweet Thing" by Rufus, as covered by Mary J. Blige.
 ‘’The Great Pretender’’ by The Platters as covered by The Band is heard when Beadie, Bunk, and McNulty are drinking at a bar. 
 "It's My Party" by Lesley Gore can be heard when Ringo meets with Sobotka.
 The song that can be heard when Nick and Ziggy are stealing the container is "Sweat It Out" by Joe Grushecky and the Houserockers.
 The song playing in Delores' bar when Ringo enters is "Mellow Down Easy" by the Paul Butterfield Blues Band.
 The song heard while Avon is reading his book at the end of the episode is "The Cisco Kid" by War.

Credits
Although credited, John Doman, Deirdre Lovejoy, and Sonja Sohn do not appear in this episode.

Guest stars
Seth Gilliam as Detective Ellis Carver
Domenick Lombardozzi as Detective Thomas "Herc" Hauk
Jim True-Frost as Detective Roland "Prez" Pryzbylewski
James Ransone as Ziggy Sobotka
Pablo Schreiber as Nick Sobotka
Kristin Proctor as Aimee
Callie Thorne as Elena McNulty
Michael K. Williams as Omar Little
Al Brown as Major Stan Valchek
Richard Burton as Sean "Shamrock" McGinty
S. Robert Morgan as Butchie
Charley Scalies as Thomas "Horseface" Pakusa
Delaney Williams as Sergeant Jay Landsman
Shamyl Brown as Donette
Luray Cooper as Nat Coxson
Michael Mack as Special Agent Marcus Lemmel
Kevin Murray as Special Agent Cleary
Ernest Waddell as Dante
Kelli R. Brown as Kimmy
Edwina Findley as Tosha Mitchell
Keith Flippen as Bruce DiBiago
Jon Garcia as Ringo
Tel Monks as Father Jerome Lewandowski

Uncredited appearances
Isiah Whitlock, Jr. as Senator Clay Davis
Antonio Charity as CO Dwight Tilghman
Erik Todd Dellums as Dr. Randall Frazier
Jeffrey Pratt Gordon as Johnny "Fifty" Spamanto
Jill Redding as Delores
Nat Benchley as Augustus Polk
Antonio Cordova as Michael McNulty
Eric Ryan as Sean McNulty

First appearances
Butchie: Supplier to CO Dwight Tilghman and adviser to Omar Little.
Aimee: Nick Sobotka's girlfriend and mother of his child.
Dante: Omar's new boyfriend and partner in crime.
Kimmy and Tosha: A young lesbian couple who make their living robbing drug dealers.
Ringo: Down-on-his-luck checker from Sobotka's union.

References

External links
"Hot Shots" at HBO.com

The Wire (season 2) episodes
2003 American television episodes
Television episodes written by David Simon